Pool B of the 2016 Fed Cup Asia/Oceania Zone Group I was one of two pools in the Asia/Oceania zone of the 2016 Fed Cup. Four teams competed in a round robin competition, with the top team and the bottom team proceeding to their respective sections of the play-offs: the top team played for advancement to the World Group II Play-offs, while the bottom team faced potential relegation to Group II.

Standings

Round-robin

Kazakhstan vs. South Korea

China vs. Chinese Taipei

Kazakhstan vs. Chinese Taipei

China vs. South Korea

Kazakhstan vs. China

South Korea vs. Chinese Taipei

References

External links 
 Fed Cup website

2016 Fed Cup Asia/Oceania Zone